İlke Özyüksel (born 26 February 1997) is a Turkish modern pentathlete. She won the bronze medal in the women's individual event at the 2022 World Modern Pentathlon Championships held in Alexandria, Egypt.

Private life
İlke Özyüksel was born to a retired worker father and a school counselor mother in Ankara on 26 February 1997. Her mother had lost her sight at the age of 15 due to ocular hypertension. Despite her 
visual impairment, she finished her higher education as the highest-ranked student.

İlke became very sick two weeks after her birth. In the beginning, it was thought that she had cancer. However, a Turkish physician working in the United States, who was in Turkey for a three-day conference, diagnosed her with Infantile hemangioma, which can be fatal if not treated. She underwent a laser therapy, and could get her health again. She was operated five times on vascular disease.

She graduated from Ankara University's Department of Physical Education.

Her father died from cancer by mid 2019.

Sports career
At the age of only nine, Özyüksel became champion at the World Championships for Cadets. In 2014, she decided to quit pentathlon upon suggestions of her coach. However, the Federation insisted in her career, and sent her for training to Hungary, where she stayed eleven months. After she broke a world record there, she became unwelcome by the Hungarian coach, and had to return home ahead of schedule. After her return, the Federation set up a 10-member team including a psychologist, a dietitian, a masseur and a physician, to prepare her for the Olympics. She trained eight hours a day for four and half months.

She won the gold medal at the UIPM 2015 Youth "A" World Championships held in Buenos Aires, Argentina. At the same competition, she set two world records for youth, in overall with 1,065 points and in combined with a time of 11:55.00 and 585 points. She earned a quota spot at the 2016 Summer Olympics in Rio de Janeiro, Brazil. She is the first ever Olympic modern pentathlon participant from Turkey. At the 2017 European Championships in Minsk, Belarus, she took the bronze medal. In the Stage 4 of 2017 World Cup held in Drzonków, Poland, she won the bronze medal, and set a world record for juniors in combined with a time of 11:57.53 and 583 points. Özyüksel captured the gold medal at the 2018 Modern Pentathlon Junior European Championships held in El Prat de Llobregat, Spain. She broke the world record with a total of 1,376 points competing in the five events of fencing, swimming, riding and shootin events. She set world records in the running and the shooting events at the 2019 European Modern Pentathlon Championships held in Bath, United Kingdom.

In 2019, she received the "Mustafa V. Koç Sports Award" worth of  250,000 (approx. USD 47,000). The prize was established jointly by the Koç Holding and the Turkish Olympic Committee in commemoration of the late Mustafa Vehbi Koç (1960–2016).

A short movie focusing on her life and career named 'Ilke' is released in 2019.

Özyüksel participated at the Tokyo Olympics and finished fifth.

She is a member of Altınordu Sports Club.

Records

References

External links
  

1997 births
Living people
Sportspeople from Ankara
Ankara University alumni
Turkish female modern pentathletes
Modern pentathletes at the 2014 Summer Youth Olympics
Modern pentathletes at the 2016 Summer Olympics
Modern pentathletes at the 2020 Summer Olympics
Olympic modern pentathletes of Turkey